Molecular Pharmaceutics is a peer-reviewed scientific journal covering research on the molecular mechanistic understanding of drug delivery and drug delivery systems, including physical and pharmaceutical chemistry, biochemistry and biophysics, molecular and cellular biology, and polymer and materials science.

Background 
First published in 2004 by the American Chemical Society, it is considered one of the most prestigious journals in the field of pharmaceutics, physical pharmacy and drug delivery. Its publication frequency switched from bimonthly to monthly in 2012. According to the Journal Citation Reports, the journal has a 2021 impact factor of 5.364. The current editor-in-chief is Lynne S. Taylor, who is preceded founding editor-in-chief Gordon L. Amidon. 

Molecular Pharmaceutics publishes reviews, research articles, brief articles, and communications.

Abstracting and indexing 
The journal is abstracted and indexed in
 Chemical Abstracts Service
 Scopus
 EBSCOhost
 PubMed
 CABI
 Web of Science
 ProQuest
 SwetsWise

References

External links 
 

American Chemical Society academic journals
Bimonthly journals
Pharmacology journals
Publications established in 2004
English-language journals